The list of ship commissionings in 2010 includes a chronological list of all ships commissioned in 2010.


See also

2010